Ankita Jhaveri is an Indian actress, who has worked primarily in Telugu cinema along with some Tamil and Kannada films.

Personal life
In March 2016, Ankita married Vishal Jagtap, a Mumbai-based businessman in New Jersey, who is VP of applications at CITI Bank

Career
Ankitha started as a child actor in the advertising campaign for juice drink product Rasna in the 1984 in India on national TV and was known as the "Rasna baby" as a child actor. Her breakthrough in films came with Simhadri starring NTR Jr. In 2005, she appeared in back-to-back Tamil films directed by Sundar C, featuring alongside Prashanth in London and then in Thaka Thimi Tha with newcomer Yuvakrishna.

Filmography

References

External links

Indian film actresses
Living people
Actresses in Tamil cinema
21st-century Indian actresses
Actresses in Telugu cinema
Actresses in Kannada cinema
Actresses from Mumbai
1982 births